"Walks Like Rihanna" is a song by the British-Irish boy band The Wanted. It was released in Australia on 10 May 2013, and in the United Kingdom and Ireland on 23 June 2013, as the third single from their third studio album Word of Mouth (2013). The song was written by Andy Hill, Henrik Michelsen, and Edvard Førre Erfjord, and it was produced by Dr. Luke and Cirkut, with additional production by Michelsen and Erfjord under their stage name Electric.

The title of the song is a reference to Barbadian singer Rihanna. It peaked at number four on the UK Singles Chart and number three in the Republic of Ireland.

Band member Tom Parker said in a press conference announcing their reunion in September 2021, that he didn't actually like the song. "That song just should not exist. Go in the bin forever. It’s the f****** worst song ever," said Parker, who passed away the following year. Bandmates Nathan Sykes and Jay McGuiness countered that "without being hateful, it is a fan favourite, it’s part of our history – and Rihanna liked it!" and "She was very flattered, which is nice."

Music video
The music video premiered on 7 May 2013, at a total length of three minutes and thirty-four seconds. It features parodies of three other well-known boy bands' videos: "Bye Bye Bye" by NSYNC, "I Want It That Way" by the Backstreet Boys, and "Back for Good" by Take That.

Track listing

Credits and personnel
Recording
Recorded at Luke's in the Boo, Malibu, California and Conway Recording Studios, Hollywood, California
Mixed at MixStar Studios, Virginia Beach, Virginia
Mastered at 360 Mastering Studios, Virginia Beach, Virginia

Personnel

Dr. Luke – songwriter, producer, instruments, programming, additional vocals
Cirkut – songwriter, producer, instruments, programming, additional vocals
Andy Hill – songwriter
Henrik Michelsen – songwriter, additional production, instruments, programming
Edvard Førre Erfjord – songwriter, additional production, instruments, programming
Clint Gibbs – engineer
Eric Eylands – assistant engineer
Rachael Findlen – assistant engineer
Serban Ghenea – mixing
John Hanes – mix engineer

Nathan Sykes – vocals
Tom Parker – vocals
Max George – vocals
Siva Kaneswaran – vocals
Jay McGuiness – vocals
Kyle Moorman – additional vocals
Chris Jones – additional vocals
Gavin Degraw – additional vocals
Martin Johnson – additional vocals
Dick Beetham – mastering

Charts

Weekly charts

Year-end charts

Certifications

Release history

References

Songs about musicians
The Wanted songs
2013 singles
2013 songs
Rihanna
Song recordings produced by Cirkut (record producer)
Songs written by Dr. Luke
Songs written by Cirkut (record producer)
Song recordings produced by Dr. Luke
Songs written by Andy Hill (composer)
Songs written by Henrik Barman Michelsen
Songs written by Edvard Forre Erfjord